The Boya, also known as Bedar Nayaka, Boya Naidu, Boyar Naidu, Boyar Nayakkar are a community found in the South Indian states of Karnataka, Andhra Pradesh, Tamil Nadu. Their traditional occupation was hunting, warriors and other martial pursuits.

History 
The earliest reference to "Boyas" is found in an inscription of the Eastern Chalukya ruler Vishnuvardhana II, where land grants are made to several people from a variety of different villages, all with Boya appended to their name. Earlier colonial scholars thought it simply meant an "inhabitant of," but more recent scholarship suggests otherwise, meaning the recipients could have been from the Boya community.

The early Boyas were thought to have been a tribal community who were graduated acculturated into caste society. This is based on evidence from clan names in both inscriptions and in present-day, which seem to be occupational in nature. By the seventh century CE, grants of villages in the Nellore-Guntur region were being made to Boyas, and a chieftain described as Nishada (most likely Boya) was ruling the fringes of Nellore as a feudal lord of Vishnuvardhana II. Nandi speculated these land grants were given because of the Boyas' predominance in what is today Southern Andhra Pradesh, a frontier region vulnerable to Pallava attacks.

The earliest references to them in Karnataka, starting from 700 CE, portray them as looters and raiders of settled villages. These references continue throughout the Medieval period. Under the name parivaras, the Bedars are mentioned as troops in use by the Cholas during the Battle of Takkolam.

After the death of Vishnuvardhana V, the Boyas rose up against the Chalukyas and quickly captured Vengi, in modern-day Coastal Andhra Pradesh. The new king sent Pandranga, a general, to defeat the Boyas. Pandranga successfully retook Vengi and conquered 12 Boya estates, and to prevent a recurrence, was made governor of the whole region.

In Kannada areas in the Medieval period, the Bedars were originally known as "Billavas" (lit. bow people) and had some power, enough to give land grants. Others had titles such as arasa and nayaka, indicating they were part of the ruling class. To further their interests, inscriptions also reveal Bedars formed associations to promote their welfare and glorify themselves. Many others were employed as talavaras (watchmen), and were often glorified in viragallu.

At the fall of the Vijayanagara empire, the power vacuum that ensued allowed many communities to come forward. Many Bedar chieftains, who had previously been subordinate now began to control territory more openly. Many of these polygars began to amass large forces of Boya troops. The entirety of Bellary was under their control at the time of its accession to the East India Company. The Bedars were heavily recruited into the armies of Mysore during the reigns of Hyder Ali and Tipu Sultan.

Status 
The early status of the Boyas is hard to pin down. As they most likely originated as a tribe, they were outside the caste system and within the same community its members could pursue different occupations. However different sections of the community who were pursuing different occupations would identify themselves with their occupation in Brahminical society, such as Boya-Brahmanas, who were generally accepted. However, they did not accept all the claims of the varnas they were in. Some inscriptions indicate some Boya clans officiated as priests for the entire community, traces of which can still be found in the relations between the Myasa-boyas and Uru-boyas. This practice is also preserved in the rite of Bhuta-bali, where a Boya priest sacrifices an animal to the village goddess and receives a cloth in return, as well as an inam (tax-free) land plot. Today, however, no Boyas are accepted as Brahmins although they claim descent from Brahminic rishis like Valmiki.

The Bedars worked in a variety of fields. Although some remained raiders and robbers, many others were granted high administrative positions such as collection of revenue.

References

Further reading
 Caste & Class Articulation of Andhra Pradesh
 Precolonial India in Practice By Cynthia Talbot
 Kiratas in Ancient India By G. P Singh
 Vol.XXXVIII, Part IV V 1986 Journal of the Andhra Historical Research Society By Dr. N. Venkataramanayya

Indian castes
Social groups of Tamil Nadu